Jahn's Hall was a concert hall in late 18th century Vienna.  It was the property of a restaurateur/caterer named Ignaz Jahn, and seated (according to Deutsch) "400 at the most".  It is remembered as a performance venue for works by Wolfgang Amadeus Mozart and Ludwig van Beethoven.

Ignaz Jahn

Jahn was born in Hungary in 1744 and died in Vienna, 26 February 1810. He was appointed Imperial caterer for Schönbrunn Palace in 1772.  In 1775 he began running a restaurant in the Augarten, and in 1782 opened an adjacent concert hall, at which many famous musicians played over the years.

Jahn's Hall was a part of Jahn's restaurant, in the main part of the city, which as of 1788 was at 6 Himmelpfortgasse.  Concerts began there after the restaurant opened, and were given on a regular basis starting in 1790.

In 2018 a restaurant opened close to Augarten, carrying his name.

Works by Mozart

His transcription of Georg Frideric Handel's masque Acis and Galatea was premiered there roughly November 1788.
His last public appearance took place in this hall on 4 March 1791. Contrary to the claim of many authors it is not known which piano concerto Mozart performed at this concert. 
The blind glass harmonica performer Marianne Kirchgessner performed in the hall 8 September 1791; she may have included the Adagio and Rondo K. 617 that Mozart wrote for her.
The first public performance of Mozart's Requiem took place in the hall on 2 January 1793.  This was a benefit concert on behalf of Mozart's widow Constanze, organized by Mozart's patron Gottfried van Swieten; it raised "more than 300 golden ducats" (about 1350 florins, a substantial sum) to support Constanze and her two sons.

Works by Beethoven

On 6 April 1797, Beethoven performed in the hall, as the pianist in his Quintet for Piano and Winds, Opus 16.
On 29 March 1798 Mozart's old friend the soprano Josepha Duschek gave a concert in the hall, performing an unidentified "rondo with obbligato basset horn".  On the same program, Ludwig van Beethoven performed one of his violin sonatas ( with the violinist Ignaz Schuppanzigh.
On 20 December 1799, Beethoven's Septet, Opus 20, was premiered in the hall.

Notes

References

Clive, Peter (2001) Beethoven and His World:  A Biographical Dictionary.  Oxford University Press.
Deutsch, Otto Erich (1965) Mozart:  A Documentary Biography.  Stanford, CA:  Stanford University Press.
Solomon, Maynard (1995) Mozart:  A Life.  New York:  Harper Collins.

Wolfgang Amadeus Mozart
Concert halls in Austria
Cultural venues in Vienna